Frank Turek (born November 20, 1961) is an American apologist, author, public speaker, and radio host. He is best known as the founder and president of Christian apologetics ministry CrossExamined.org. Turek co-authored two books (Legislating Morality and I Don't Have Enough Faith to Be an Atheist) with Christian philosopher Norman Geisler. In addition, Turek has authored two of his own books (Correct, Not Politically Correct and Stealing from God).

Turek hosts a call-in talk show called CrossExamined on American Family Radio. Turek also hosts a television show, I Don't Have Enough Faith to Be an Atheist, which airs on the NRB Network.

Early life
Turek was born in New Jersey on November 20, 1961. Turek was raised Catholic, but he became a Protestant during his time as a Naval Flight Officer in the U.S. Navy after being recommended apologetic books written by Josh McDowell, in particular Evidence That Demands a Verdict and More Than a Carpenter. Turek earned a Master of Public Administration degree from George Washington University. He also earned a Doctor of Ministry in Apologetics degree from Southern Evangelical Seminary. Turek has taught classes in Leadership and Management at George Washington University.

Christian apologetics
Turek co-authored the book I Don't Have Enough Faith to Be an Atheist with Norman Geisler. Turek frequently delivers seminars based on I Don't Have Enough Faith to Be an Atheist at universities and churches throughout America. Turek is an advocate of intelligent design. Turek is a critic of macroevolution but believes that changes within species occur over time.

In 2008, Turek and atheist Christopher Hitchens debated the existence of God. In 2011, Turek and Hitchens debated the topic of atheism or theism best explaining reality.

Views
In the book I Don't Have Enough Faith to Be an Atheist, Geisler and Turek think American culture demands truth from doctors, stock brokers, loved ones, etc., and yet does not typically demand truth when it comes to morality or religion. Geisler and Turek argue that truth is based in correspondence to an absolute reality, and is therefore not subjective. On this basis, Geisler and Turek argue it therefore follows that religious truth is also objective, and for one to claim "All truth is relative!" or "There are no absolutes!" is self-refuting.

After arguing for the objectivity of truth, Geisler and Turek argue for the objectivity of knowledge. Geisler and Turek ask those who argue that one cannot know anything for sure if they can know that for sure. The duo argues that if the proponent is sure, the statement presented is, therefore, self-refuting and if the proponent is not sure, the presented argument collapses. Geisler and Turek conclude that people cannot be skeptics about everything, as the proponent would logically have to doubt skepticism: the more one doubts skepticism, the more certain they become.

Geisler and Turek argue that the existence of God implies the possibility of miracles. Borrowing an illustration seminary professor Ronald H. Nash created (a metaphor of the universe representing an open box from a theistic worldview perspective), Geisler and Turek argue that the universe is effectively open for the creator of the universe to reach in and perform what one might call miracles. Geisler and Turek expand on the metaphor by claiming, "a worldview is like a box top that allows you to place the many pieces of life’s puzzle into a complete, cohesive picture."

Marriage
Turek argues in Correct, Not Politically Correct: How Same-sex Marriage Hurts Everyone that marriage lengthens lifespans of men and women, civilizes men, protects women, protects mothers, lowers welfare costs, and encourages a replacement birth rate, and he argues that same-sex marriage does none of these. After a student in a leadership seminar Turek taught in 2010 at Cisco discovered his views on marriage and reported them to the company's human resources department, Turek lost his position as consultant for Cisco. Bank of America also cancelled a seminar presentation for the same reason.

Bibliography
Turek's co-authored book Legislating Morality: Is It Wise? Is It Legal? Is It Possible? was the winner of the Evangelical Christian Publishers Association's Gold Medallion Book Award Christianity and Society section in 1999.
Legislating Morality: Is it Wise? Is it Legal? Is it Possible? (1998) 
I Don't Have Enough Faith to Be an Atheist (2004) 
Correct, Not Politically Correct: How Same-Sex Marriage Hurts Everyone (2008) 
Stealing from God: Why Atheists Need God to Make Their Case (2014)

References

External links
 

1961 births
American Christian creationists
American Christian writers
Former Roman Catholics
Converts to evangelical Christianity from Roman Catholicism
American evangelicals
Christian apologists
American anti-same-sex-marriage activists
Critics of atheism
Critics of postmodernism
George Washington University faculty
Intelligent design advocates
Living people
Trachtenberg School of Public Policy & Public Administration alumni
Writers from New Jersey